The Trial of Donald Duck is a 1948 animated short film featuring Donald Duck.  It was released by Walt Disney Productions.

Plot
Donald Duck is put on trial by a restaurant.

Donald is trying to have his lunch, but it is raining hard outside. Ducking into a fancy restaurant, a waiter seats him. As he only has a nickel, Donald feels that he can use it to get a cup of coffee. However, he only receives a cup of espresso which is the size of a thimble. Donald flies into a rage at this, refusing to pay.

As the waiter tries to figure out what to do, he spots Donald unpacking his dishes from his lunch box. Being sneaky, Pierre decides to charge Donald for the food that he brought into the restaurant. This leads to Donald receiving a bill for $35.99 (equal to $442.50 in 2022). Once again angered at the injustice, Donald flies into a rage, and the matter is taken to court.

Donald's lawyer portrays and confesses him as a victim in the entire mess, but the judge rules in favor of the restaurant, ordering Donald to either pay ten dollars (which is equivalent to $121.64 in 2022), or wash dishes for ten days, OR ELSE!!!

Donald accepts the ten days, but spends the entire time at the restaurant's kitchen sink destroying the dishes. The waiter pleads with Donald to stop, promising to let the whole matter go, but Donald angrily turns to him and says, 'You heard what the Judge said...ten days!' and continues with his reckless 'chore'.

Voice cast
Clarence Nash as Donald Duck

Home media
The short was released on December 11, 2007 on Walt Disney Treasures: The Chronological Donald, Volume Three: 1947-1950.

References

External links
 
 

1948 films
1948 animated films
1940s Disney animated short films
Donald Duck short films
Films produced by Walt Disney
Films scored by Oliver Wallace